The 1958 NCAA Track and Field Championships were contested June 13−14 at the 37th annual NCAA-sanctioned track meet to determine the individual and team national champions of men's collegiate track and field events in the United States. This year's meet was hosted by the University of California at Edwards Stadium in Berkeley.

USC won the team national championship, the Trojans' 20th team title in program history.

Team Result 
 Note: Top 10 only
 (H) = Hosts

See also 
 NCAA Men's Outdoor Track and Field Championship
 1957 NCAA Men's Cross Country Championships

References

NCAA Men's Outdoor Track and Field Championship
NCAA Track and Field Championships
NCAA
NCAA Track and Field Championships